Kladentsi may refer to the following places in Bulgaria:

Kladentsi, Blagoevgrad Province
Kladentsi, Dobrich Province